Federal Neuro-Psychiatric Hospital, Enugu is a federal government of Nigeria speciality hospital located in Enugu, Enugu State, Nigeria. The current chief medical director is Monday Igwe.

History 
Federal Neuro-Psychiatric Hospital, Enugu was established on 1962. The hospital was formerly an Outpatient Unit.

CMD 
The current chief medical director is Monday Igwe.

References 

Hospitals in Nigeria